The Brown Line (Line 12)  is a proposed line of the Delhi Metro, a rapid transit system in Delhi, India and is scheduled to be opened in 2025.

The line, proposed to be  in length, will have eight stations from Lajpat Nagar to Saket G-Block. This Line is a part of Phase 4 of Delhi Metro.

Stations 

The stations proposed for the Brown Line are:

References 

Delhi Metro lines